Jorge Manuel Pinto Cordeiro (born 2 September 1978) is professional football coach and former player. He played as a midfielder, predominantly in Portugal's lower leagues. He had a briefly spell in the Norwegian football before retiring.

Club career
Cordeiro was born in Portalegre and started playing aged 7 hometown's Estrela de Portalegre. In 1991, he moved to S.L. Benfica youth system. In the 1997–98 season he was loaned to SL Olivais.

After one season in Portimão, Cordeiro returned to Benfica to play in the reserves team in 1999. On 4 October 2000, he was called by first-team coach José Mourinho for a friendly match against Olympique de Marseille. In November, he received another call, this time to a Primeira Liga match against Vitória de Guimarães, but eventually did not leave the bench, subsequently returning to the B-side.

On 30 May 2012, Cordeiro signed for Norwegian side Follo FK.

International career
In 1995, Cordeiro helped the under-16s winning that year's UEFA European Championship. He scored three goals, including the solo winning goal against host Belgium in the quarterfinals and one in the semi-final against Germany.

Later that year, he was named in the squad for the 1995 FIFA U-17 World Championship and played four games in an eventual quarter-final exit.

In 1997, he represented the Portugal under-18 team in the UEFA European Under-18 Championship, held in Iceland. Portugal reached the final and lost 1-0 in the against France.

Four categories comprised, Cordeiro amassed 34 caps and scored 11 goals.

Coaching career
While playing for AD Oeiras, Cordeiro he earned his  UEFA 'C' and 'B' Licences. While he was playing for Follo, he started coaching the under-14s of his local team, Ski IL.

Club statistics

Honours

Club
Oeiras
 AF Lisboa 1ª Divisão Honra: 2008–09

Follo
 2. divisjon: 2012

Country
Portugal
 UEFA European Under-16 Championship: 1995
 UEFA European Under-18 Championship: Runner-up 1997

References

External links
 
 
 
 Portuguese Football Federation profile

1978 births
Living people
People from Portalegre, Portugal
Portuguese footballers
Association football midfielders
Primeira Liga players
Portimonense S.C. players
S.L. Benfica B players
Seixal F.C. players
F.C. Barreirense players
S.C.U. Torreense players
Clube Oriental de Lisboa players
AD Oeiras players
Follo FK players
Portugal youth international footballers
Portuguese expatriate footballers
Expatriate footballers in Norway
Portuguese expatriate sportspeople in Norway
Sportspeople from Portalegre District
S.L. Benfica non-playing staff